The following is a list of events relating to television in Ireland from 2018.

The Late Late Toy Show was the most watched programmes on Irish television in 2018.

Events
8 January – Micko airs on RTÉ One.
23 January – Saorview announces the launch of Free TV, a channel designed to promote the launch of its premium service Saorview Connect.
3 February – Ireland's Got Talent makes its debut on TV3.
24 March – RDC win the first series of Ireland's Got Talent.
26 March – Jake Carter and dance partner Karen Byrne win the second series of Dancing with the Stars.
7 May – RTÉ announce plans for a timeshift channel for RTÉ2.
6 June – Ireland's Got Talent will make its UK television debut on 5Star.
30 August – TV3 is rebranded as Virgin Media One, while its sister channels 3e and be3 become Virgin Media Two and Three respectively. A fourth pay TV sports channel, Virgin Media Sport, launches on the Virgin Media platform.
1 September – To coincide with the rebranding of TV3 to Virgin Media One, the Saturday AM and Sunday AM breakfast programmes are renamed as "Weekend AM".
18 September – Launch of Virgin Media Sport.
28 September – Players of the Faithful airs on RTÉ One.
12 October – The Late Late Show is broadcast live from Central Hall Westminster in London, the first time the programme has broadcast from the United Kingdom since 1980.

Debuts
3 February – Ireland's Got Talent on TV3
8 February – The Young Offenders on RTÉ2
27 August - Killing Eve on RTÉ2
10 October – Finding Joy on RTÉ1
26 November – Death and Nightingales on RTÉ1

Ongoing television programmes

1960s
 RTÉ News: Nine O'Clock (1961–present)
 RTÉ News: Six One (1962–present)
 The Late Late Show (1962–present)

1970s
 The Late Late Toy Show (1975–present)
 The Sunday Game (1979–present)

1980s
 Fair City (1989–present)
 RTÉ News: One O'Clock (1989–present)

1990s
 Would You Believe (1990s–present)
 Winning Streak (1990–present)
 Prime Time (1992–present)
 Nuacht RTÉ (1995–present)
 Nuacht TG4 (1996–present)
 Ros na Rún (1996–present)
 TV3 News (1998–present)
 Ireland AM (1999–present)
 Telly Bingo (1999–present)

2000s
 Nationwide (2000–present)
 TV3 News at 5.30 (2001–present) – now known as the 5.30
 Against the Head (2003–present)
 news2day (2003–present)
 Other Voices (2003–present)
 Saturday Night with Miriam (2005–present)
 The Week in Politics (2006–present)
 Xposé (2007–2019)
 At Your Service (2008–present)
 Operation Transformation (2008–present)
 3e News (2009–present)
 Dragons' Den (2009–present)
 Two Tube (2009–present)

2010s
 Jack Taylor (2010–present)
 Mrs. Brown's Boys (2011–present)
 MasterChef Ireland (2011–present)
 Irish Pictorial Weekly (2012–present)
 Today (2012–present)
 The Works (2012–present)
 Deception (2013–present)
 Celebrity MasterChef Ireland (2013–present)
 Second Captains Live (2013–present)
 Claire Byrne Live (2015–present)
 The Restaurant (2015–present)
 Red Rock (2015–present)
 TV3 News at 8 (2015–present)
  Ploughing Live (2015–present)
 First Dates (2016–present)
 Dancing with the Stars (2017–present)
 The Tommy Tiernan Show (2017–present)
 Striking Out (2017–present)

Ending this year

Dolores O'Riordan 8th January

See also
2018 in Ireland

References